Trymbak B. Telang was an early Indian cinematographer. He was trained in the operation of the Williamson camera. He shot for films such as Raja Harishchandra  (1913) and Satyavadi Raja Harishchandra and Lanka Dahan (1917).

References

Cinematographers from Maharashtra
Year of death missing
Year of birth missing